Carbazocine is an opioid analgesic of the benzomorphan family which was never marketed.

See also 
 Benzomorphan

References 

Analgesics
Carbazoles
Tryptamines
Opioids